Moisés Fuentes García (born 22 September 1974) is a Colombian Paralympic swimmer who competes in international level events. He is a triple Paralympic medalist, a World champion and a triple Parapan American Games champion.

In October 1992, Fuentes and his older brother Rodrigo were attacked by gunmen in Santa Marta outside of his brother's coffee stall. Moisés was shot in the vertebrae resulting in paraplegia from the waist down and his right leg was amputated below the knee, his brother was killed in the attack.

References

1974 births
Living people
Paralympic swimmers of Colombia
Swimmers at the 2000 Summer Paralympics
Swimmers at the 2004 Summer Paralympics
Swimmers at the 2008 Summer Paralympics
Swimmers at the 2012 Summer Paralympics
Swimmers at the 2016 Summer Paralympics
Medalists at the 2008 Summer Paralympics
Medalists at the 2012 Summer Paralympics
Medalists at the 2016 Summer Paralympics
Medalists at the World Para Swimming Championships
Medalists at the 2003 Parapan American Games
Medalists at the 2011 Parapan American Games
Medalists at the 2015 Parapan American Games
Medalists at the 2019 Parapan American Games
S5-classified Paralympic swimmers
Sportspeople from Santander Department
Shooting survivors
21st-century Colombian people